Perzyce  or Pierzyce is a village in the administrative district of Gmina Zduny, within Krotoszyn County, Greater Poland Voivodeship, in west-central Poland. During Kingdom of Poland, the village was officially recognized as Pierzyce.

The village has an approximate population of 250.

References

Perzyce